Khe is a Gur language of Burkina Faso. Other than Dogoso, is distant from other languages

References

Gur languages
Languages of Burkina Faso